Britt Allcroft (born Hilary Mary Allcroft, 14 December 1943) is a British writer, producer, director and voice actress. She is the creator of the children's television series Thomas the Tank Engine & Friends (later re-titled Thomas & Friends), Shining Time Station (with Rick Siggelkow), Mr. Conductor's Thomas Tales and Magic Adventures of Mumfie. She also wrote, co-produced and directed the film Thomas and the Magic Railroad (2000).

Early life
She was born Hilary Mary Allcroft on 14 December 1943 in Worthing, West Sussex, England. At the age of 16, she changed her first name to Britt as her career in British radio and television gained momentum. She went on to create a succession of programmes for the BBC and ITV during the 1970s and 1980s, including Moon Clue Game, Dance Crazy and Keepsakes. Mothers By Daughters, produced for Channel Four, was broadcast by PBS in the United States. She also worked in theatre, staging shows at the London Palladium and Drury Lane Theatres.

Career
While making a documentary about British steam trains in August 1979, Allcroft met the Reverend Wilbert Awdry, author of the children's book series The Railway Series. She said, "It really didn't take me long to become intrigued by the characters, the relationships between them and the nostalgia they invoked." She told him that she wanted to bring these stories to life and made an arrangement to secure certain rights through his then-publishers Kaye & Ward.

In 1980, she co-founded Britt Allcroft Railway Productions (internationally known as The Britt Allcroft Company) with her husband, television producer Angus Wright. It took Allcroft four years to raise the funding for, and create, a first series of 26 episodes in collaboration with director David Mitton. The first two episodes of Thomas the Tank Engine & Friends, shot on 35 mm film, with narration by Ringo Starr in the UK/US and music by Mike O'Donnell and Junior Campbell, were aired together for the first time on British television on 9 October 1984.

The success of the series in the UK, and the merchandising campaign that Allcroft had been organising since 1983, soon led to further success in other parts of the world. In 1989, she and American producer Rick Siggelkow created Shining Time Station, a live-action children's sitcom fronted by the magical character of the miniature Mr. Conductor, who introduced two Thomas stories in each half-hour programme. Shining Time Station won a number of awards and significantly increased the popularity of the Thomas media franchise in the US. Shining Time Station lasted until 1995 and, in 1996, she created the short spin-off series Mr. Conductor's Thomas Tales.

In 1994, Allcroft followed Thomas the Tank Engine & Friends and Shining Time Station with the cartoon-animated Magic Adventures of Mumfie, in collaboration with director John Collins. Inspired by the books by Katharine Tozer, that production received critical acclaim and was seen worldwide. In 2008, several years after she left her original company, Allcroft revived the Mumfie library, and a reboot series eventually aired in 2021.

Allcroft wrote and directed Thomas and the Magic Railroad, a film based on the Thomas franchise, that was released in 2000. She also provided the voice of the character Lady. The film was a critical and commercial failure. The poor box-office performance of the film caused Allcroft to resign as deputy chairman of her company in September 2000. She has not been active in the industry since then.

Personal life
Allcroft was previously married to television producer Angus Wright, but later divorced. She has two children.

Filmography

References

Further reading
"Thomas Flotation Steams Ahead" (The Independent, 18 October 1996).

External links

Article on Allcroft and Gullane/HIT

1943 births
Living people
20th-century English actresses
20th-century English women writers
20th-century English writers
21st-century English actresses
21st-century English women writers
21st-century English writers
English children's writers
English company founders
English expatriates in the United States
English film directors
English film producers
English screenwriters
English television producers
English television writers
English theatre managers and producers
English voice actresses
English women in business
Gullane Entertainment
People from Worthing
Television show creators
British women television producers
British women television writers
Women theatre managers and producers
Writers from Sussex